Sardar Qaisar Abbas Khan Magsi is a Pakistani politician who had been a Member of the Provincial Assembly of the Punjab from July 2022 till January 2023. He previously served in this role from April 2008 to April 2013 and from June 2013 to May 2018.

Early life and education
He was born on 15 May 1965 in Layyah District.

He has a degree of Bachelor of Arts  which he obtained from Bahauddin Zakariya University.

Political career
He was elected to the Provincial Assembly of the Punjab as a candidate of Pakistan Muslim League (N) (PML-N) from Constituency PP-264 (Layyah-III) in 2008 Pakistani general election. He received 34,171 votes and defeated Sardar Shahab-ud-Din Khan.

He was re-elected to the Provincial Assembly of the Punjab  as a candidate of PML-N from Constituency PP-264 (Layyah-III) in 2013 Pakistani general election.

In April 2018, he announced to quit PML-N.

References

Living people
Punjab MPAs 2013–2018
1965 births
Pakistan Muslim League (N) politicians
Punjab MPAs 2008–2013
Bahauddin Zakariya University alumni